Sidli Assembly constituency is one of the 126 constituencies of the Assam Legislative Assembly in India. Sidli forms a part of the Kokrajhar Lok Sabha constituency.

Members of Legislative Assembly 
 1951: Rupnath Brahma, Indian National Congress
 1962: Rupnath Brahma, Indian National Congress
 1967: Uttam Brahma, Indian National Congress
 1972: Uttam Brahma, Indian National Congress
 1978: Panchanan Brahma, PTC
 1983: Luis Islari, Indian National Congress
 1985: Janendra Basumatary, PTC
 1991: Khiren Borgoyary, Independent
 1996: Andrias Hajoary, Independent
 2001: Matindra Basumatary, Independent
 2006: Chandan Brahma, Independent
 2011: Chandan Brahma, Bodoland People's Front
 2016: Chandan Brahma. Bodoland People's Front
 2021: Joyanta Basumatary, United People's Party Liberal

Election results

2016 result

References

External links 
 

Assembly constituencies of Assam